Charles Marion Miller (September 18, 1889 – June 16, 1961) was a Major League Baseball outfielder who played for the St. Louis Cardinals in  and .

External links

1889 births
1961 deaths
Major League Baseball outfielders
St. Louis Cardinals players
Baseball players from Ohio
Houston Buffaloes players
Minor league baseball managers
People from Woodville, Ohio